José Ignacio Inchausti Bravo (born 1 January 1973 in Madrid) is a Spanish former rugby union player and coach. He is nicknamed Tiki. He played as a centre.

Playing career
He debuted for the Spain national rugby union team in a test match against Japan in Tokyo, on 20 August 1999. He played in the 1999 Rugby World Cup and also in the 2001 Rugby World Cup Sevens in Mar del Plata. His last international match was against Slovenia at Ljubljana, on 27 March 2005. At the time of his World Cup cap, despite being the only squad member to play for a Spanish second division club, Moraleja Alcobendas, where he played for his entire career. Alfonso Feijoo had included him primarily because of his speed and potential despite having yet to score for Spain.

Coaching career
From 2008, Inchausti was named as coach of the  Spain national rugby sevens team. He was named again as coach of the Spain national rugby sevens team in 2015, replacing Alberto Socías. He also coached Spain during the 2016 Summer Olympics. Currently, as of 2016, he coaches his former club Alcobendas Rugby.

References

External links
 

1973 births
Living people
Sportspeople from Madrid
Spanish rugby union players
Rugby union centres
Spain international rugby union players
Spanish rugby union coaches
Coaches of international rugby sevens teams
Spanish Olympic coaches
Rugby union players from the Community of Madrid